Bagnoles de l'Orne Normandie is a commune in the department of Orne, northwestern France. The municipality was established on 1 January 2016 by merger of the former communes of Bagnoles-de-l'Orne (the seat) and Saint-Michel-des-Andaines.

See also 
Communes of the Orne department

References 

Communes of Orne
Populated places established in 2016
2016 establishments in France